Taped is a 2012 Dutch thriller film directed by Diederik van Rooijen.

The film won the Best Feature Film award at the 2012 Stony Brook Film Festival. Susan Visser was also nominated for the Golden Calf for Best Actress for her role in the film.

Visser was also nominated for the Best Actress Rembrandt Award in 2013. The film was nominated for the Best Film Rembrandt Award as well.

Plot 

Johan (Barry Atsma) and Saar (Susan Visser) go on holiday to Argentina and end up capturing a murder on tape perpetrated by a local cop.

References

External links 
 

2012 films
2010s Dutch-language films
Dutch thriller films
Films shot in Buenos Aires
Films directed by Diederik van Rooijen